Hoseynan (also Romanized as Ḩoseynān and Ḩoseynān; also known as Ḩoseynīān, Hoseynīyān, Husain Nūd, Husain Nūn, and Husinan) is a village in Qohab-e Rastaq Rural District, Amirabad District, Damghan County, Semnan Province, Iran. At the 2006 census, its population was 178, in 50 families.

References 

Populated places in Damghan County